The 2013 Women's Hockey Asia Cup was the eighth tournament of the Women's Hockey Asia Cup. It was held in Kuala Lumpur, Malaysia from 21 to 27 September 2013.

All matches were held at Malaysia National Hockey Stadium.

Results
All times are local (UTC+8).

Preliminary round

Pool A

Pool B

Classification round

Fifth to eighth place classification

Crossover

Seventh and eighth place

Fifth and sixth place

First to fourth place classification

Semi-finals

Third and fourth place

Final

Awards

Statistics

Final standings

Goalscorers

See also
2013 Men's Hockey Asia Cup

External links
Official website

Women's Hockey Asia Cup
Asia Cup
International women's field hockey competitions hosted by Malaysia
Hockey Asia Cup
Asia Cup
Sports competitions in Kuala Lumpur
2010s in Kuala Lumpur
Asia Cup